Steven Galliers (born 21 August 1957) is an English former professional footballer who played in the Football League for Wimbledon, Crystal Palace, Bristol City and Maidstone United.

References

1957 births
Living people
People from Fulwood, Lancashire
English footballers
Association football midfielders
Chorley F.C. players
Wimbledon F.C. players
Crystal Palace F.C. players
Bristol City F.C. players
Maidstone United F.C. (1897) players
Kingstonian F.C. players
English Football League players